Make It Reign is the only studio album by American rap duo Lord Tariq and Peter Gunz. It was released on June 2, 1998 through Columbia Records. Recording sessions took place at the Hit Factory, at Unique Recordings, at the Cutting Room in New York City, at Ameraycan Studio and at Skip Saylors in Los Angeles. Production was handled by Dave Atkinson, DJ Clark Kent, Floyd Wilcox, Father Time, KNS, Peter Gunz, Ron Lawrence, Ski and Spyda. It features guest appearances from 1 Accord, Big Pun, Cam'ron, Chauncey Hannibal, Fat Joe, Kurupt, Sticky Fingaz and Will Tracks. The album peaked at #38 on the Billboard 200 and #8 on the Top R&B/Hip-Hop Albums in the United States, selling 40,000 copies in its first week.

Its lead single "Deja Vu (Uptown Baby)" peaked at #9 on the Billboard Hot 100, #4 on the Hot R&B/Hip-Hop Songs, #1 on the Hot Rap Songs, and was certified platinum by the Recording Industry Association of America for selling over one million copies. "Fiesta" is censored on the explicit version of the album.

Track listing

Sample credits
Track 1 contains samples from "Night Rider" performed by Alan Hawkshaw
Track 3 contains a sample from "The Break In" performed by Marvin Gaye
Track 6 contains an interpolation of "All Night Long" written by Lionel Richie
Track 8 contains samples from "Wanna Be Startin' Somethin'" performed by Michael Jackson
Track 11 contains elements from "Black Cow" performed by Steely Dan
Track 12 contains samples from "Keep That Same Old Feeling" performed by The Crusaders
Track 16 contains an interpolation of "Award Tour" written by Jonathan Davis, Ali Shaheed Muhammad, Malik Taylor & Weldon Irvine

Personnel

Sean Hamilton – main artist
Peter Pankey – main artist, producer (track 8)
1 Accord – featured artist (tracks: 9, 18), backing vocals (track 8)
Ricardo Brown – featured artist (track 3)
Kirk Jones – featured artist (track 3)
Will Tracks – featured artist (track 6)
Chauncey Hannibal – featured artist (track 8)
Cameron Giles – featured artist (track 14)
Joseph Cartagena – featured artist (track 16)
Christopher Rios – featured artist (track 16)
Diane Gordon – backing vocals (track 13)
Brenda Marquez – backing vocals (track 18)
Debbie Mercado – backing vocals (track 18)
Sara Ortiz – backing vocals (track 18)
Mike Lorello – keyboards (track 18)
Kenny Ortiz – mixing
Eliud "Lou" Ortiz – mixing
Louis Alfred III – mixing, recording
Troy Hightower – mixing
George Mayers – mixing
Julian McBrowne – mixing
Ken "Duro" Ifill – mixing
Paul Falcone – recording
Chris Puram – recording
Acar Key – recording
Miles "DJ Nastee" Balochian – recording
Tulio Torrinello – recording
Teddy Riley – re-mixing (track 8)
Adam Olmstead – mixing assistant
Chuck Shaw – mixing assistant
Todd Butler – mixing assistant
Dave Butcher – mixing assistant
Dave O'Donnell – mixing assistant
Ethan Schofer – mixing assistant
Antonio "Tony G" Gonzalez – mixing assistant
Kevin Lewis – mixing assistant
Mike Koch – mixing assistant
Tom Hughes – recording assistant
James Olowokere – recording assistant
Brian Calicchia – recording assistant
Remy Ramos – recording assistant
David Crafa – recording assistant
Brady Barnett – recording assistant
Alex Sprague – engineering assistant
Tom Coyne – mastering
Rodolfo Franklin – producer (tracks: 1, 3, 12)
Dave Atkinson – producer (tracks: 2, 5, 9, 10, 13, 14)
Floyd Wilcox – producer (tracks: 6, 10)
Ross Sloane – producer (track 9)
K. "DJ KNS" Streaks – producer (track 11)
David Anthony Willis – producer (track 16)
T. "Father Time" Speedy – producer (track 17)
Ron "Amen-Ra" Lawrence – producer (track 18)
Bodyguard – co-producer (track 13)
Kevin Mitchell – executive producer, management
Eric Beasley – associate producer, management
Tracey Waples – A&R executive
Lisa Hamilton – cover design
Penna Omega – logo design
Tim Carter – photography

Charts

References

External links

1998 debut albums
Columbia Records albums
East Coast hip hop albums
Albums produced by Clark Kent (producer)
Albums produced by Ski Beatz